Ramona Balthasar (born 9 January 1964) is a German rower.

Balthasar was born in 1964 in Forst, Bezirk Cottbus, East Germany. She initially competed for SG Dynamo Potsdam and was chosen for the 1984 Summer Olympics but did not compete due to the Eastern Bloc boycott. During 1985, she changed to SC Dynamo Berlin. At the 1985 World Rowing Championships in Hazewinkel, she became world champion in the quad scull boat class. She changed from sculling to sweep rowing and at the 1988 Seoul Olympics, she won gold with the women's eight. At the 1989 World Rowing Championships in Bled, she won silver in the same boat class.

In October 1986, she was awarded a Patriotic Order of Merit in gold (first class) for her sporting success. Balthasar studied medicine.

References 

1964 births
Living people
Sportspeople from Forst (Lausitz)
People from Bezirk Cottbus
East German female rowers
Olympic gold medalists for East Germany
Olympic medalists in rowing
Medalists at the 1988 Summer Olympics
Recipients of the Patriotic Order of Merit in gold
Olympic rowers of East Germany
Rowers at the 1988 Summer Olympics
World Rowing Championships medalists for East Germany